The Shin is a Georgian fusion jazz band formed in Germany in 1998. The music of The Shin smoothly combines Georgian folk melodies with jazz, famous native polyphonic singing with scat, and tunes of the near Orient and flamenco with a modern Western sound. The Shin was founded by Zaza Miminoshvili (guitars, panduri) and Zurab Gagnidze (bass, vocals), and joined by Mamuka Ghaganidze (vocals, percussion) in 2002. Ghaganidze died from skin cancer in August 2019.

The group represented Georgia in the Eurovision Song Contest 2014 along with singer Mariko Ebralidze with the song "Three Minutes to Earth", but they came in last place in their semi-final and did not advance.

The word "Shin" literally means "home" or "going home" in the Georgian language.

Discography

References

Jazz fusion ensembles
Musicians from Georgia (country)
Eurovision Song Contest entrants of 2014
Eurovision Song Contest entrants for Georgia (country)